Oregano (Origanum vulgare) is an herb commonly used in cooking.

Oregano may also refer to:

Plants
 Lippia graveolens, Mexican oregano
 Lippia micromera (Spanish thyme), a species in the Lippia genus
 Plectranthus amboinicus, Cuban oregano
 Poliomintha bustamanta (Mexican oregano), in the Poliomintha genus
 Poliomintha longiflora (Mexican oregano), in the Poliomintha genus

Other
 OREGANO 1973 implementation of ALGOL 68 programming language
 Oregano (software), a program for simulation of electrical circuits
 Oregano (web browser), a web browser
 Oregano oil, an oil extracted from the herb Oregano